Jean Cornelis (2 August 1941 – 21 March 2016) was a Belgian football player. He was born in Lot.

He played for R.S.C. Anderlecht and the Belgium national team. Cornelis played in the match Belgium-Netherlands in 1964 with 10 fellows from the Anderlecht team after the substitution of goalkeeper Delhasse by Jean-Marie Trappeniers. He worked for R.S.C. Anderlecht.

Honours

Player 
RSC Anderlecht

 Belgian First Division: 1958-59, 1961–62, 1963–64, 1964–65, 1965–66, 1966–67, 1967–68
 Belgian Cup: 1964–65
 Inter-Cities Fairs Cup runners-up: 1969–70

References

External links
 

1941 births
2016 deaths
Belgian footballers
R.S.C. Anderlecht players
K.S.K. Beveren players
Belgium international footballers
Belgian football managers
R.A.A. Louviéroise managers
K.V.V. Crossing Elewijt players
People from Beersel
Association football fullbacks
Footballers from Flemish Brabant